Clear Creek is a stream in eastern Daviess County in the U.S. state of Missouri. It is a tributary of the Grand River.

The stream headwaters arise at  approximately 1.5 miles east of Jamesport.

Clear Creek most likely was named for the clarity of water.

See also
List of rivers of Missouri

References

Rivers of Daviess County, Missouri
Rivers of Missouri